Raytown is an unincorporated community in Taliaferro County, in the U.S. state of Georgia.

History
The community was named after the Ray family. A variant name was "Ray's Place". A post office called Raytown was established in 1835, and remained in operation until 1867.

References

Unincorporated communities in Taliaferro County, Georgia
Unincorporated communities in Georgia (U.S. state)